Trichophysetis cretacea, the jasmine bud borer, is a moth in the family Crambidae described by Arthur Gardiner Butler in 1879. It is found in Japan, Russia and China.

The wingspan is 12–15 mm.

The bore the flower buds of Jasminum sambac.

References

Cybalomiinae
Moths described in 1879
Moths of Asia